Humann is a surname. Notable people with the surname include:

Carl Humann (1839–1896), German engineer, architect and archaeologist
Doug Humann, as of 2021 CEO of Landcare Australia
Edgar Humann (1838–1914), Chief of Staff of the French Navy in 1894–95
Georg Humann (1847–1932), German art historian
Georges Humann (1780–1842), French financier and politician
Hans Humann (1878–1933), German officer, diplomat and businessman
Johann Jakob Humann (1771–1834, German Roman Catholic clergyman
L. Phillip Humann (born 1945), American businessman
Richard Humann (born 1961), American artist

See also
Heumann, surname
Human (surname)